Mark Millon (born May 17, 1971) is a retired American lacrosse player who last played for the Rochester Rattlers of Major League Lacrosse. He attended Harborfields Highschool in Huntington, Long Island. He played collegiate lacrosse at the University of Massachusetts. He is widely regarded as one of the greatest lacrosse players of all time.

Playing career 
Millon was a college player at the University of Massachusetts Amherst, where he gained honors as a three-time All-American (twice on the first team), leading UMass to three births in the NCAA tournament. After college, he moved to Baltimore and where he played alongside his brother Tony Millon while leading the Mount Washington Wolfpack to several US Club Lacrosse championships. During his time on the Wolfpack, he often relied upon his superior speed and agility to isolate one defenseman before dodging around him to score. This talent was noticed by the US Lacrosse World team coaches which included Millon on two rosters, earning a spot as one of the World's Best Attackman in 1998, the overall World Games
MVP in the 1994 World Games, as well as being named to the All-World Team in 1994 and 1998.

He joined the Baltimore Bayhawks in 2001 and played with them until 2005 when he was traded to the Boston Cannons. He rejoined the Baltimore Bayhawks for the 2006 season, and played one game in the beginning of the 2007 season before announcing he would not play the remainder of the season due to other commitments.  Later, in the season he joined the Long Island Lizards organization.

He retired again after the 2007 season as the league's all-time leading scorer.

Millon was selected in the 2013 MLL Supplemental Draft after announcing his return to the MLL after a five-season absence. He was selected first by the Rochester Rattlers and made his Rattlers debut on April 27, 2013, with a one goal-one-assist performance.

Mark also played nine seasons in the indoor National Lacrosse League. He played for the New York Saints, Baltimore Thunder, Syracuse Smash, and Philadelphia Wings.

Later career 
For 14 years, Mark has run the Millon International Lacrosse Camps, long considered the nation's top instructional lacrosse camp.  His camp enrollment is nearly double that of the second biggest camps in the country.

In 2009, Millon was inducted into the National Lacrosse Hall of Fame.

Mark Millon Coached and was Director of Player and Coach Development for the Baltimore Breakers Club Lacrosse program from 2013 to 2014.

In 2015, Mark Millon became head of operations the Team 91 Lacrosse Club's new Maryland program, "Team 91 MD".

MLL Honors
Major League Lacrosse All-Star Game MVP 2001
Major League Lacrosse MVP Award 2005
Major League Lacrosse Offensive Player of the Year Award 2002, 2003

Statistics

NLL

MLL

4. MARK MILLON (1990–93) YEAR G 1990 14 1991 38 1992 45 1993 58 TOTALS 155
A P
5 19 13 51 17 62 23 81 58 213

References

1971 births
Living people
American lacrosse players
Chesapeake Bayhawks players
Major League Lacrosse major award winners
Major League Lacrosse players
Mount Washington Lacrosse Club players
People from Huntington, New York
Philadelphia Wings players
Sportspeople from New York (state)
UMass Minutemen lacrosse players